Sphragifera is a genus of moths of the family Noctuidae.

Species
 Sphragifera biplagiata (Walker, 1865)
 Sphragifera maculata (Hampson, 1894)
 Sphragifera rejecta (Fabricius, 1775)
 Sphragifera sigillata (Menetries, 1859)

References
Natural History Museum Lepidoptera genus database

Hadeninae